Leckwith Stadium may refer to:

 Cardiff Athletics Stadium, Cardiff; former
 Cardiff International Sports Stadium, Cardiff; current